Sadoun Salman (born 28 August 1977) is a Kuwaiti footballer. He competed in the men's tournament at the 2000 Summer Olympics.

References

External links
 

1977 births
Living people
Kuwaiti footballers
Kuwait international footballers
Olympic footballers of Kuwait
Footballers at the 2000 Summer Olympics
Place of birth missing (living people)
Association football midfielders
Al Salmiya SC players
Kuwait Premier League players